Loverboy is a 2011 Romanian drama film directed by Cătălin Mitulescu. It premiered in the Un Certain Regard section at the 2011 Cannes Film Festival. The story is based on real events. It follows a young man who seduces women in order to bring them into a prostitution network.

Cast
 George Piştereanu as Luca
 Ada Condeescu as Veli
 Ion Besoiu as Bunicul
 Clara Vodă as Doamna Savu
 Bogdan Dumitrache as Dumitrache
 Coca Bloos as Ramona
 Remus Mărgineanu as Toader
 Alexandru Mititelu as Zvori
 Adina Galupa as Dani
 Adrian Moroianu as Moritz
 Matei Onea as Matei
 Andrei Runcanu as Florin
 Veronica Neculai as Leti
 Robert Soare as Soare
 Pablo Malaurie as Aurica

See also
Romanian New Wave

References

External links
 

2011 films
2010s Romanian-language films
2011 drama films
Films directed by Cătălin Mitulescu
Romanian drama films